Acute hemorrhagic edema of infancy is a skin condition that affects children under the age of two with a recent history of upper respiratory illness, a course of antibiotics, or both. The disease was first described in 1938 by Finkelstein and later by Seidlmayer as "Seidlmayer cockade purpura".

See also 
 Cutaneous small-vessel vasculitis
 List of cutaneous conditions
 Henoch–Schönlein purpura

References

External links 

Vascular-related cutaneous conditions